The Jailbreakers is a 1960 American film written, produced and directed by Alexander Grasshoff in his debut feature film that was  released by American International Pictures as a double feature with Why Must I Die? (1960).

Cast
 Robert Hutton ... Tom
 Mary Castle 	... June
 Michael O'Connell 	... Lake
 Gabe Delutri 	... 	Joe
 Anton von Stralen 	...  Stearn
 Toby Hill 	...  Karen
 Carlos Chávez ... Bushman
 Coleman Francis

References

External links

1960 films
1960 crime drama films
American International Pictures films
Films set in ghost towns
Films directed by Alex Grasshoff
1960 directorial debut films
1960s English-language films